Ram Narayan Bishnoi (1932–2012)  was a leader of Bharatiya Janata Party from Rajasthan. He was deputy speaker of Rajasthan Legislative Assembly from 2004 to 2008. He was a member of the assembly elected from Phalodi in 1990, 1998 and 2003.

References

1932 births
2012 deaths
Deputy Speakers of the Rajasthan Legislative Assembly
People from Jodhpur district
Bharatiya Janata Party politicians from Rajasthan